Mir Abdul Hussain Sangi Talpur, was a Sindhi language poet, prose and novel writer during the British Empire. He was born in Kolkata. His father Mir Abbas Ali Talpur was held in jail; his father married an English lady; Mir Abdul was born from this union in 1851. In childhood he stayed there but when young Mir Abdul was six years old his father died in Calcatta, and he started living with his paternal uncle Mir Hussan Ali Khan Talpur; in 1863 he arrived in Sindh with his uncle.

References

Sindhi-language writers
Sindhi-language poets
19th-century Indian poets
Writers from Kolkata
1851 births
1924 deaths